I Cannot Say "Farewell" is a 1982 romantic drama directed by Boris Durov. The film was very popular in the Soviet Union, seen by 32 million viewers in the first two months of its release and 34.6 million in total, reaching the 4th place at the 1982 Soviet box office.

Plot
Plain and homely Lida Tenyakova meets handsome womanizer Sergei Vatagin at a dance party and falls in love with him. But Sergei does not have any real feelings for her and ends up marrying another woman, Marta.

Cast
Sergei Varchuk - Sergei Vatagin
Anastasia Ivanova - Lida Tenyakova
Tatiana Parkina - Marta
Sofya Pavlova - Evdokia Semyonovna, Sergei's mother
Alexander Korshunov - Vasily, a traffic police officer
Sergei Minaev - singer on the dance floor
Alexander Savchenko - Misha, Sergei's friend, director of forestry
Klavdia Kozlenkova - wedding guest
Vladimir Antonik - Kostya, Sergei's friend

References

External links
 

1982 romantic drama films
1982 films
Soviet romantic drama films
Russian romantic drama films
Films directed by Boris Durov